Olivier Borios (born 23 June 1959) is a retired breaststroke swimmer from France, who represented his native country at the 1980 Summer Olympics in Moscow, Soviet Union. He claimed the gold medal a year earlier at the 1979 Mediterranean Games in the Men's 100m Breaststroke event.

He has been 10 times national champion of the 100 meters breaststroke (winter and summer 1978, winter and summer 1979, winter and summer 1980, winter and summer 1981, winter and summer 1982) and 9 times national champion of the 200 meters breaststroke (winter and summer 1977, winter and summer 1978, winter 1979, winter and summer 1980, winter and summer 1981).

He swam at the EN Castres, at the Cercle des nageurs d'Antibes, at the Racing Club de France and at the Toulouse Athletic Club (TAC), where he currently swims and coaches other swimmers.

References
 Profile

1959 births
Living people
French male breaststroke swimmers
Swimmers at the 1980 Summer Olympics
Olympic swimmers of France

Mediterranean Games gold medalists for France
Swimmers at the 1979 Mediterranean Games
Mediterranean Games medalists in swimming
20th-century French people
21st-century French people